Dobritz is a village and a former municipality in the district of Anhalt-Bitterfeld, in Saxony-Anhalt, Germany. Since 1 January 2010, it has been part of the town of Zerbst.

Former municipalities in Saxony-Anhalt
Zerbst